Pursurah Assembly constituency is an assembly constituency in Hooghly district in the Indian state of West Bengal.

Overview
As per orders of the Delimitation Commission, No. 199 Pursurah Assembly constituency is composed of the following: Pursurah community development block, along with Arunda, Balipur, Rammohan I, Rammohan II and Tantisal gram panchayats of Khanakul I community development block, and Harinkhola I and Harinkhola II gram panchayats of  Arambagh community development block.

Pursurah Assembly constituency is part of No. 29 Arambagh (Lok Sabha constituency) (SC).

Members of Legislative Assembly

Election results

2021

2016

2011
In the 2011 elections, Sk. Parvez Rahman of Trinamool Congress defeated his nearest rival Soumendranath Bera of CPI(M).

 
  

.# Swing calculated on Congress+Trinamool Congress vote percentages taken together in 2006.

1977-2006
In the 2006 state assembly elections Saumendranath Bera of CPI(M) won the Pursurah assembly seat defeating Sk. Parvez Rahman of Trinamool Congress. Contests in most years were multi cornered but only winners and runners are being mentioned. Nimai Mal of CPI(M) defeated Sk. Pervez Rahman of Trinamool Congress in 2001 and Gour Mohan Maity of Congress in 1996. Bishnupada Bera of CPI(M) defeated Bibhuti Bhusan Roy of Congress in 1991 and Santi Mohun Roy of Congress in 1987. Santi Mohun Roy of Congress defeated Bishnupada Bera of CPI(M) in 1982. Manoranjan Hazra of CPI(M) defeated Durga Charan Chakrabarty of Janata Party in 1977.

1967-1972
Mahadeb Mukhopadhyay of Congress won in 1972 and 1971. Santi Mohan Roy of Congress won in 1969 and 1967. Prior to that the Pursurah seat did not exist.

References

Assembly constituencies of West Bengal
Politics of Hooghly district